Neopetrolisthes is a genus of porcelain crabs that live on sea anemones., and contains the following three species:
 Neopetrolisthes maculatus (H. Milne-Edwards, 1837) – N. ohshimai Miyake, 1937 is a subjective synonym
 Neopetrolisthes alobatus  (Laurie, 1926)
 Neopetrolisthes spinatus Osawa & Fujita, 2001

References

Porcelain crabs
Decapod genera